9994 Grotius , provisional designation , is a stony Rafita asteroid from the middle regions of the asteroid belt, approximately 3.5 kilometers in diameter. It was discovered during the Palomar–Leiden survey in 1960, and named after Dutch jurist Hugo Grotius.

Discovery 

Grotius was discovered on 24 September 1960, by the Dutch astronomers Ingrid and Cornelis van Houten, on photographic plates taken by Dutch–American astronomer Tom Gehrels at Palomar Observatory in California, United States.

Survey designation 

The survey designation "P-L" stands for Palomar–Leiden, named after Palomar Observatory and Leiden Observatory, which collaborated on the fruitful Palomar–Leiden survey in the 1960s. Gehrels used Palomar's Samuel Oschin telescope (also known as the 48-inch Schmidt Telescope), and shipped the photographic plates to Ingrid and Cornelis van Houten at Leiden Observatory where astrometry was carried out. The trio are credited with the discovery of several thousand minor planets.

Orbit and classification 

Grotius orbits the Sun in the central main-belt at a distance of 2.1–3.0 AU once every 4 years and 2 months (1,518 days). Its orbit has an eccentricity of 0.18 and an inclination of 7° with respect to the ecliptic. The body's observation arc begins with its official discovery observation at Palomar.

Rotation period 

In August 2010, a rotational lightcurve of Grotius was obtained from photometric observations in the R-band at the Palomar Transient Factory in California. Lightcurve analysis gave a rotation period of 9.2189 hours with a brightness variation of 0.27 magnitude.

Diameter and albedo 

According to the survey carried out by the NEOWISE mission of NASA's Wide-field Infrared Survey Explorer, Grotius measures 3.746 kilometers in diameter and its surface has an albedo of 0.263. The Collaborative Asteroid Lightcurve Link assumes a standard albedo for stony asteroids of 0.20 and calculates a diameter of 3.38 kilometers based on an absolute magnitude of 14.72.

Naming 

This minor planet was named for Dutch jurist Hugo Grotius (1583–1645), who laid the foundations for international law, based on natural law. He was a child prodigy and entered Leiden University when he was just eleven years old. The approved naming citation was published by the Minor Planet Center on 11 November 2000.

References

External links 
 Asteroid Lightcurve Database (LCDB), query form (info)
 Dictionary of Minor Planet Names, Google books
 Asteroids and comets rotation curves, CdR – Observatoire de Genève, Raoul Behrend
 Discovery Circumstances: Numbered Minor Planets (5001)-(10000) – Minor Planet Center
 
 

009994
Discoveries by Cornelis Johannes van Houten
Discoveries by Ingrid van Houten-Groeneveld
Discoveries by Tom Gehrels
4028
Named minor planets
19600924